Tau Sigma Delta is a scholastic honor society that recognizes academic achievement among students in the field of Architecture and Allied Arts.

History
Tau Sigma Delta was organized at the University of Michigan as an honorary fraternity in architecture and landscape design in May 1913, at the proposal and under the direction of the faculty members of the Departments of Architecture and Landscape Design at the University of Michigan. It was first known as Tau Delta Sigma and continued under that name until the fall of 1914 when it was decided to change the name to the present one there being Greek letter societies already bearing the first name. It was the intention of the founders that the organization should be a national society as opportunity for its extension to other schools and universities could be had.

 according to the Constitution of Tau Sigma Delta, the purpose of the society is stated as follows: "It shall be the purpose of Tau Sigma Delta fraternity to unite in a firm bond of friendship, such students of architecture and the allied arts, whose marked scholastic ability, moral character and pleasing personality has shown them worthy of distinction, and to foster and promote high standards of study in the schools and colleges of architecture and the allied arts." The society is a purely honorary organization, and only a very limited number of new members are elected each year.

Each chapter has a definite plan of government and elects its members who are chosen only upon the approval of the faculty of the school at which the chapter is located.

A series of medals are available as awards for achievement, in bronze, silver and gold.

Chapters
Chapters of Tau Sigma Delta include:
Α, University of Michigan -  (Time of inactivity started in 1997, unclear when ended)
Β, University of Minnesota -  (inactive 1935, reactivated by 1941)
Χ, University of Illinois - approx  (inactive 1918)
Δ, Syracuse University -  (inactive 1966)
Ε, University of Pennsylvania -  (inactive 1968)
Ζ, University of Liverpool -   (or )(Inactive 1930 or 1923)
Γ, Carnegie Institute of Technology -  (Inactive 1959)
Η, University of California, Berkeley -  (or ) (Inactive 1936)
Θ, Ohio State University -  (or ) (Inactive 1935)
Ι, University of Washington, Seattle -  (or )
Κ, Iowa State University - 
Μ, University of Texas, Austin -  (or ) (Inactive 1968)
Λ, University of Southern California -   (Inactive approximately 1985)
Ν, Virginia Tech -  
ΗΑ, Tulane University -  (Out of sequence chapter name requested by group to keep name of previous organization)
Ο, Kansas State University -  (or )
Π, University of Kansas - 
Ρ, Georgia Tech -  (or )
Σ, University of Notre Dame - 
Τ, Rice University - 
Υ, Texas Tech University - 
Φ, Clemson University -  (or )
Ψ, University of Nebraska -  (or )
Ω, University of Florida -  (or )
ΑΑ, Texas A&M University - 
ΑΒ, Howard University -  (or )
ΑΓ, Oklahoma State University -  (Inactive 1978)
ΑΔ, North Dakota State University-  (or )
ΑΕ, Kent State University -   (or )
ΑΧ, University of Kentucky -  
ΑΖ, Louisiana State University - 
ΑΗ, University of Arkansas - 
ΑΘ, Auburn University - 
ΑΙ-ΑΨ, ???
ΑΛ, Louisiana Tech University - 
ΑΩ, Mississippi State University - 
ΒΑ, University of Tennessee - 
ΒΒ, California Polytechnic State University (San Luis Obispo) - 
ΒΓ, University of Miami - 
ΒΔ, University of Houston - 
ΒΕ, University of Idaho - 
ΒΖ-ΒΗ, ???
ΒΘ, Montana State University - 
ΒΙ, Miami University - 
ΒΚ, University of North Carolina (Inactive)
ΒΛ, University of Colorado Denver - 
ΒΜ, Arizona State University - 
ΒΝ-ΒΡ, ???
ΒΣ, University of Detroit Mercy - 
ΒΤ, Roger Williams University - 
ΒΥ, Andrews University - 
ΒΦ, The Catholic University of America -
ΒΧ, Tuskegee University - 
ΒΨ, California State Polytechnic University, Pomona - 
ΒΏ, Southern University and A&M College (Baton Rouge) - 
ΓΑ, University of Louisiana at Lafayette - 
ΓΒ, Ball State University - 
ΓΓ, Florida A&M University - 
ΓΔ, Lawrence Technological University - 
ΓΕ, Drury University - 
ΓΖ, New York Institute of Technology - 
ΓΗ, Savannah College of Art and Design (Both Savannah and Atlanta campuses) - 
ΓΘ, North Carolina State University - 
ΓΙ, Prairie View A&M University - 
ΓΚ, Washington State University - 
ΓΛ, University of New Mexico - 
ΓΜ, University of Hawaii at Manoa - 
ΣΞ, Florida International University - 
ΔΛ, University of South Florida - 
ΤΩ, University of Texas at San Antonio - 

 the total membership of the society was 88.

Notable and Honorary members
Notable and honorary members of Tau Sigma Delta include:

Eliel Saarinen - Honorary -Alpha
Ivan Meštrović - Honorary - Delta
Donald Barthelme - Epsilon

Symbols
The motto of the fraternity is "Technitai, Sophoi kai Dexioi". The system of colors is gold and white. The flower of the society is the red rose.

The pledge button consists of an outer scalloped band of gold within which is one concentric ring of gold and two concentric rings of white.

The badge of the fraternity is a gold key consisting of the crossed letters, Tau Sigma Delta, a suspension ring at the top and a pendant at the bottom. The crossed letters of the same arrangement as on the key is the crest of the fraternity. Honor stoles are available for graduation regalia.

The fraternity publishes a quarterly bulletin.

Gold Medal Recipients

The Gold Medal is awarded by the Grand Chapter of the Society to a professional or professionals with a record of high distinction in design in the field of architecture, landscape architecture or the allied arts. The award is presented annually as a part of the Association of Collegiate Schools of Architecture (ACSA) national meeting.

2019 Wang Shu and Lu Wenyu
2018 Tod Williams and Billie Tsien
2017 Maurice Cox
2016 Toshiko Mori
2015 Thom Mayne
2014 Bernard Tschumi
2013 Gregg Pasquarelli
2012 Teddy Cruz
2011 David Adjaye
2010 Marion Weiss and Michael Manfredi
2009 Patricia Patkau
2008 Elizabeth Diller
2007 Richard Rogers
2006 Shigeru Ban
2005 Martha Schwartz
2004 Mary Miss
2003 Michael Graves
2002 Cynthia Weese

2001 Malcolm Holzman
2000 Pierre Koenig
1999 William J. R. Curtis
1998 William Pedersen
1997 César Pelli
1996 Vincent Scully
1995 Peter Eisenman
1994 Harvey B. Gantt
1993 Harold L. Adams
1991 Denise Scott Brown
1990 Joseph Esherick
1989 Richard Meier
1988 Kenneth Frampton
1987 Lawrence Halprin
1986 Walter Netsch
1985 Pietro Belluschi

1984 Fay Jones
1983 Ricardo Legorreta
1982 Moshe Safdie
1981 & 1992 Charles Moore
1980 Alexander Girard
1979 Edmund Bacon
1978 William Caudill
1977 Harry Weese
1976 Vincent Kling
1975 Hugh Stubbins
1974 Ian McHarg
1973 Arthur Erickson
1972 O'Neil Ford
1971 Gunnar Birkerts
1970 Norman Fletcher

See also
 Association of College Honor Societies

References

External links
 
 Tau Sigma Delta chapter list at ACHS

Association of College Honor Societies
Honor societies
Student organizations established in 1913
1913 establishments in Michigan